This is a list of fossiliferous stratigraphic units in Malawi.



See also 
 Lists of fossiliferous stratigraphic units in Africa
 List of fossiliferous stratigraphic units in Mozambique
 List of fossiliferous stratigraphic units in Zambia
 Geology of Malawi

References

Further reading 
 T. G. Bromage, F. Schrenk, and Y.M. Juwayeyi. 1995. Paleobiogeography of the Malawi Rift: Age and vertebrate paleontology of the Chiwondo Beds, northern Malawi. Journal of Human Evolution 28:37–57
 J. D. Clark and C.V. Haynes. 1970. An elephant butchery site at Mwaganda's Village, Karonga, Malawi, and its relevance for Paleolithic archaeology. Quaternaria 13:305–354
 F. Dixey. 1925. The discovery of fossil reptiles. Annual Report of the Geological Survey Department for the Year 1924, Nyasaland Protectorate 1924:7
 S. H. Haughton. 1926. On Karroo [sic] vertebrates from Nyasaland. Transactions of the Geological Society of South Africa 29:69–83
 L. L. Jacobs, D. A. Winkler, Z.M. Kaufulu and W.R. Downs. 1990. The Dinosaur Beds of northern Malawi, Africa. National Geographic Research 6(2):196–204
 O. Kullmar, O. Sandrock, R. Abel, F. Schrenk, T. Bromage and Y. Juwayeyi. 1999. The first Paranthropus from the Malawi Rift. Journal of Human Evolution 37:121–127
 P. A. Meylan, B.S. Weig, and R. Wood. 1990. Fossil soft-shelled turtles of the Lake Turkana Basin, Africa. Copeia 1:508–528
 F. Schrenk, T.G. Bromage, C.G. Betzler, U. Ring, and Y.M. Juwayeyi. 1993. Oldest Homo and Pliocene biogeography of the Malawi Rift. Nature 365:833–836

Malawi
 
 
Fossiliferous stratigraphic units
Fossil